Let's Get Married (French: Marions-nous) is a 1931 French comedy film directed by Louis Mercanton and starring Alice Cocéa, Fernand Gravey and Marguerite Moreno.

It was made at the Joinville Studios in Paris by the French subsidiary of Paramount Pictures as a remake of the company's 1930 film Her Wedding Night. Such multiple-language versions were common in the early years of sound film before dubbing became commonplace.

Main cast
 Alice Cocéa as Gisèle Landry 
 Fernand Gravey as Francis Latour 
 Marguerite Moreno as Madame Marchal 
 Robert Burnier as Claude Mallet 
 Pierre Etchepare as Adolphe 
 Jacqueline Delubac as Simone 
 Helena D'Algy as Lolita 
 Véra Flory as Maroussia

References

Bibliography 
 Waldman, Harry & Slide, Anthony. Hollywood and the Foreign Touch: A Dictionary of Foreign Filmmakers and Their Films from America, 1910-1995. Scarecrow Press, 1996.

External links 
 

1931 films
French comedy films
1931 comedy films
1930s French-language films
Films directed by Louis Mercanton
Films shot at Joinville Studios
Paramount Pictures films
French black-and-white films
1930s French films